The Interdisciplinary Group of Independent Experts (Grupo Interdisciplinario de Expertos Independientes, GIEI) is a committee of jurists and doctors created by the Inter-American Commission on Human Rights to carry out a parallel investigation of the abduction and disappearance of 43 students from the Ayotzinapa Rural Teachers' College in Iguala, Guerrero, Mexico. The group was established in 2014 and issued two reports by 2016. It was reactivated in 2020.

Legal scholars described the Group as "the first experience of international monitoring carried out within a criminal investigation process of its kind. It can be replicated and contribute to the investigation of emblematic cases and regional settings where processes of mass victimisation have occurred."

References 

Intergovernmental human rights organizations
Human rights in Mexico
2014 establishments
Inter-American Commission on Human Rights